Serhiy Kostyuk (born 5 March 1986 in Kharkiv, Ukrainian SSR) is a Ukrainian football midfielder.

Kostyuk is a product of the FC Metalist Kharkiv youth sport school and spent time playing for the Ukrainian teams in the different league's levels. In July 2016, he signed a contract with the Georgian FC Imereti Khoni from the Erovnuli Liga 2.

References

External links

1986 births
Living people
Footballers from Kharkiv
Ukrainian footballers
Association football midfielders
Ukrainian expatriate footballers
Expatriate footballers in Georgia (country)
Ukrainian expatriate sportspeople in Georgia (country)
Ukrainian Premier League players
Ukrainian First League players
Ukrainian Second League players
Erovnuli Liga 2 players
FC Metalist Kharkiv players
FC Metalist-2 Kharkiv players
FC Volyn Lutsk players
FC Hoverla Uzhhorod players
FC Helios Kharkiv players
FC Arsenal-Kyivshchyna Bila Tserkva players
FC Kramatorsk players
FC Solli Plyus Kharkiv players
FC Kolos Zachepylivka players
FC Vovchansk players